Peter Tsai (Chinese: 蔡秉燚; born February 6, 1952) is a Taiwanese-American inventor and material scientist who is best known for inventing and patenting the N95 mask filter. He is an expert in the field of nonwoven fabric. Tsai was a Professor Emeritus at the University of Tennessee, but ended his retirement during the COVID-19 pandemic to research N95 mask sterilization.

Early life and education
Tsai grew up on his family's farm in the Qingshui District of Taichung, Taiwan and graduated from Taichung Municipal Cingshuei Senior High School. He studied chemical fibre engineering at the Provincial Taipei Institute of Technology, now known as National Taipei University of Technology.

Career
After graduating college he went to work at the Taiwan Textile Research Institute before finding work in a dyeing and finishing plant. He then went abroad to the United States for postgraduate work at Kansas State University in 1981, completing over 500 credits in a variety of subjects including mathematics, physics, and chemistry. 

After receiving his doctorate in materials science, Tsai went to teach and work at the University of Tennessee. In total, he holds 12 U.S. patents and over 20 commercial license agreements. Tsai retired from the University of Tennessee in 2019. He was a professor in the Department of Material Science and Engineering. 

In 2020, Tsai came out of retirement in response to the COVID-19 pandemic, he has been working with the scientific collective N95DECON on ways to decontaminate N95 masks.

N95 mask
In 1992 while at the University of Tennessee, Tsai led a team attempting to develop electrostatic filtration technology. Their research was successful and led to the creation of the N95 face mask filter. The material consists of both positive and negative charges, which are able to attract particles — such as dust, bacteria and viruses — and trap at least 95 percent of them by polarization before they can pass through the mask. It was patented in the U.S. in 1995.

The N95 mask was first adapted for industrial use with its utility in medical applications being discovered only later. Tsai continued to do work into mask technology and in 2018 he developed a new technique which doubled the filtration capacity of medical masks.

See also
 List of Taiwanese inventions and discoveries
 Taiwanese Americans
 List of Taiwanese Americans

References

Living people
20th-century American inventors
20th-century American scientists
20th-century Taiwanese scientists
21st-century American inventors
21st-century American scientists
American materials scientists
Kansas State University alumni
National Taipei University of Technology alumni
Scientists from Taichung
Taiwanese emigrants to the United States
Taiwanese inventors
Taiwanese materials scientists
University of Tennessee faculty
Year of birth missing (living people)